Hot Rods refers to a number of British oval racing formula (not to be confused with hot rods, which are generally road-going modified vintage cars). Hot Rod racing was introduced at Hednesford Hills Raceway in the early 1960s as a British counterpart to NASCAR-style production car racing. The term 'stock car' was not adopted because it was already in use for a form of oval racing in Britain that had evolved in a very different way than American stock cars.

In south west England, hot rod racing evolved from a class known as sports and production car racing, which began at to be held at tracks in Plymouth and St Austell in the 1950s.

The rules of Hot Rod racing vary depending on promoters, of which there are many, most vehicles are based on European or Japanese hot hatches such as the Vauxhall Tigra and races are conducted on tarmac ovals 1/4 mile in length. Despite deliberate contact between cars being banned accidents are common due to the large number of cars (30+) within a tight environment.

The fastest and most expensive Rod formula are the National Hot Rods (not to be confused with the American-based National Hot Rod Association) which use tube chassis, kevlar bodies and highly tuned 2 litre straight-4 engines. This formula also races in Ireland, continental Europe and South Africa. They have similarities with some of the more sophisticated mini-stock divisions in the USA. The World Championship race for the National Hot Rods is staged at the annual spedeweekend at Foxhall Stadium in Ipswich, which is traditionally held during the first weekend of July each year.

A smaller class known as 2 Litre Hot Rods are the next class down and are usually considered a stepping stone to the National class. Using smaller Hatchback style cars such as the Citroën Saxo. Their annual  World Championship race is held at various tracks in England and Scotland, With every third running being staged at either of the two Spedeworth-sanctioned tracks (Tullyroan Oval or Aghadowey Oval) in Northern Ireland.

World Championship
First held in 1972, The World Championship Race for the National Hot Rods is considered the biggest and most important race of the year.

In its early years the title befitted from the invitation of drivers from across the globe. Later years have seen the event take on a more domestic focus, although frequently featuring European and South African representation where the formula also race.

Numbering System
As the sport developed across the country in the 1970s there was some confusion as drivers from different regions and promoters found themselves racing with the same numbers. The National Hot Rod Promoters Association (NHRPA) decided to introduce a national numbering system to help stop confusion, this format was used up until 1989.

 Incarace 1-299
 Spedeworth 300-599
 PRI 600-699
 West Country (Autospeed) 700-799
 Scotland 800-899
 Northern Ireland 900-999

See also
Stock Car Speed Association, American-style stock cars in Britain.

External links
National Hot Rod website
, Waterford Raceway, Short Circuit oval racing in Waterford Ireland
 Photos from Hot Rod World Finale Ipswich 2011
whistlinjacksmith.co.uk - Hot Rod website
 National Hot Rod Photo Gallery

Auto racing by type
Stock car racing in the United Kingdom
Racing car classes